Franco da Rocha is a municipality in the state of São Paulo. It is part of the Metropolitan Region of São Paulo. The population is 156,492 (2020 est.) in an area of 132.78 km². The suburban city is served by CPTM Line 7 (Ruby).

The municipality contains the  Juqueri State Park, created in 1993.

In February 2016, the municipality signed a Friendship Declaration with Stepanakert, the capital of the partially independent Republic of Artsakh.

References

External links 
  EncontraFrancodaRocha - Por toda la ciudad de Franco da Rocha

Municipalities in São Paulo (state)